Karl Ágúst Úlfsson (born 4 November 1957) is an Icelandic director, actor and writer. He is best known for his acting in the Líf trilogy and with the comedy group Spaugstofan.

Selected filmography
 Nýtt Líf (1983) - Daníel Ólafsson
 Dalalíf (1984) - Daníel Ólafsson
 Löggulíf (1985) - Daníel Ólafsson
 Harry & Heimir: Morð eru til alls fyrst (2014) - Harry

References

External links

Living people
1957 births
Karl Agust Ulfsson
Karl Agust Ulfsson
Karl Agust Ulfsson
Karl Agust Ulfsson
Karl Agust Ulfsson